World Be Gone is the seventeenth studio album by English synth-pop duo Erasure, released by Mute Records on 19 May 2017 in the United Kingdom and on 20 May 2017 in North America. The album reached number six on the UK Albums Chart, dropping out of the chart the next week.

Background
In February 2017, it was announced via the Erasure Information Service newsletter that a new album project had been launched on Pledgemusic. The lead single received its UK radio premiere on 16 March on DJ Chris Evans' radio show following a conversation with singer Andy Bell. The album was made available on CD, black vinyl, orange vinyl and on cassette (with the latter including a download code). Thus World Be Gone was one of the few mainstream albums in the year 2017 to be made available as a CD, on vinyl and on cassette at the same time, very much like album releases in the late 80s and early 90s.

Critical reception

World Be Gone received generally positive reviews from critics. At Metacritic, which assigns a normalized rating out of 100 to reviews from mainstream publications, the album received an average score of 69, based on 10 reviews.

Track listing

Charts

References

2017 albums
Erasure albums
Mute Records albums